Zeilinger is a German surname. Notable people with the surname include:

Anton Zeilinger (born 1945), Austrian quantum physicist, Nobel Prize laureate
Gabriele Zeilinger (1917–2011), Austrian fencer

See also
48681 Zeilinger, a main-belt asteroid

German-language surnames